Ador Welding Limited (formerly known as Advani–Oerlikon Limited) is an industrial manufacturing company headquartered in Mumbai, India. The flagship company of the Ador Group, Ador Welding produces a variety of welding products, industry applications, and technology services, including welding consumables (electrodes, wires, and fluxes) and welding and cutting equipment.  It has over 30% market share in the organized welding market and is considered one of the major players in the Indian welding industry. Ador PEB is the company's project engineering division. PEB is based in Pune and has provided services to the Indian Government's Bharat Nirman Program in the field of combustion and thermal engineering technologies.

History 

Ador Welding Limited was formerly known as Advani–Oerlikon Ltd. and traces its history back to 1908 and five men, all originally from Karachi: Kanwalsing Malkani, Vasanmal Malakani, Jotsing Advani, Bhagwansing Advani, and Gopaldas Mirchandani. In 1951 to meet India's growing demand for welding electrodes, JB Advani & Co formed a joint venture with Oerlikon-Buhrle of Switzerland to manufacture them. The resulting company, Advani–Oerlikon Ltd., helped build India's welding industry, which at the time was in its infancy.

In early 1970s, the company began expanding into other sectors in India, such as electronic equipment, metal reclamation solutions for industrial components, energy solutions and cosmetics. During this decade, a separate entity, Ador Powertron, was established for manufacturing electronic power equipment. The 1970s also saw the formation of Ador Fontech, a company providing metal reclamation and surfacing solutions for industrial components. Within ten years, Ador Fontech had become the number two company after Larsen and Toubro in the metal reclamation sector.

In 1986 JB Advani & Co launched an initial public offering and ceased to be the holding company of Advani-Oerlikon Ltd. In 2003 the joint Advani–Oerlikon association came to an end and the company changed to its current name Ador Welding Limited.

Ador Welding PEB 
Milestones 
1989: Project Engineering Business got established
1994: Enlisted as LSTK contractor for Flare systems
1998: awarded ISO 9001 Certification for entire plant
1999: ventured on their own as Ador Technologies Ltd.
2001: Merged with Ador Welding Ltd as PEB – a division of AWL
2002: Registered in Oman for flare systems
2005: Awarded OHSAS 18001 Certification for entire plant
2007: Established Fabrication Unit for Process Equipment for Pressure Vessels, Heat Exchangers, Reactors
2008: Awarded ASME approval in "U", "R" and "NB" Stamp for Pressure Vessels, Heat Exchangers
2008: Registration in UAE for Flares
2011: Re-certification of ASME approval in "U" and "R"

Facilities 

 A distributor and sales network of over 125 outlets throughout India
 Four manufacturing units located in Silvassa, Coimbatore, Raipur, and Pune (India). (The units are ISO 9001:2000 certified for quality management systems and ISO 14001:2004 standard for environment management systems and are audited by NCC Abu Dhabi and PDO Oman.)
 Eleven area offices in India and one overseas office in Sharjah (United Arab Emirates)
 Distributor bases in the Persian Gulf/Middle East, Southeast Asia and Africa
 Two Research and Development Centers in India at Pune and Silvassa
 The Ador Welding Academy (AWA) for training welders in welding techniques and procedures. The AWA (Formerly AIWT) has trained over 60,000 welders in India

Leadership 
The following are the key executives of the company as of 2011:

 N Malkani Nagpal, Director
 R A Mirchandani, Director
 A T Malkani, Director
 D A Lalvani, Director

Clients

Ador Welding's services to clients have included:
 Providing welding service applications and consumables to the Navaratna Companies.
 Developing special electrodes for welding of the penstocks at the Bhakra Dam, as well as those at Hirakud, Nagarjuna Sagar, and Koyna.
 Assisting in the erection of plants and the introduction of rutile based electrodes and orbital welders for Bharat Heavy Electricals Limited, National Thermal Power Corporation, and Neyveli Lignite Corporation.
 Providing solutions for welding high-alloy austenitic materials, high-temperature materials and capillary tubes for Bhabha Atomic Research Centre, and nuclear power plants ar Kalpakkam, Narora, and Kaiga.
 Developing a high productivity welding process for Suzlon, NEPC Group, and Wescare (India) Limited.
 Providing technical knowhow and consumables for the erection of plants at Bhilai, Salem, and Durgapur.
 Developing special welding applications and consumables for ONGC, GAIL, and Bharat Petroleum.
 Helping to set up the structure and mining process operations for Coal India, Nalco, Bharat Gold Mines, and Indian Rare Earths Limited.
 Providing technology and consumables for maintenance of worn out rail track points and crosses for Indian Railways.

References

External links
 
)

Welding
Manufacturing companies based in Mumbai
Manufacturing companies established in 1951
Indian companies established in 1951
1951 establishments in Bombay State
Companies listed on the National Stock Exchange of India
Companies listed on the Bombay Stock Exchange